Jonsen is a patronymic surname meaning "son of Jon". Notable people with the surname include:

Albert R. Jonsen (1931–2020), biomedical ethicist and author
Hans Olav Jonsen aka (Sola), Norwegian musician in the band DumDum Boys

See also
Johnsen

Patronymic surnames